Carifiesta is an annual Caribbean Carnival held in Montreal, Quebec, Canada. It was established in 1974, and is held in July. The event is coordinated by the Caribbean Cultural Festivities Association, a nonprofit organization. Carifiesta was established prior to some Carnivals that take place in the Caribbean, for example, Cayman Carnival Batabano. Carifiesta has also been named the largest North-American running Caribbean Street Parade.  

Carifiesta does not celebrate any singular Caribbean culture, rather it is meant to celebrate them all coming together.  It features culture, music, art, and carnival costumes. Many Caribbean people or people of Caribbean descendants find that Carifiesta is a way for them to celebrate their heritage away from home.

Events

Parade 
The main feature of the carnival is a parade along Saint-Catherine Street with people representing various countries in the Caribbean. Flatbed trucks carry disk jockeys playing turntables. Soca music and calypso music are played on speakers. The participants in the parade, dressed in colorful costumes, wave flags, blow whistles, and dance.

Junior Parade 
A Carifiesta junior carnival, for kids aged 2 to 16, is held one week prior to the main parade, and is intended to introduce children to Caribbean culture. The day after the main parade, is the Carifiesta Cooldown, held at Parc Jean-Drapeau, which is a family oriented event featuring performances by local and international guest artists. 2017 will be the 5th year that the junior carnival has taken place. The parade officially begins at noon, at the Bill Durnan arena, and ends at Van Horne Park.

Costumes 
The costumes worn at Carifiesta are similar to those of other Caribbean Carnival celebrations. They are designed to show a lot of skin and feature bright colors, beading, and exotic headdresses. Women will typically be seen in bikini-style outfits, covered in gems, beads, and sequins, and adorned with feathered headdresses to match. Male costumes consist of decorated, and colorful shorts, paired with beaded neck pieces. Costumes at Carifiesta vary from the typically skin-bearing costumes, some people will wear costumes with a more obvious theme that will offer more coverage. Some dress in apparel that comes from the era in which their ancestors were enslaved, to call attention to their heritage. Since 2014 there have been more carnival bands doing Jab throwing, oil, mud, paint, ink like its J'ouvert.

History 
In 1995 the parade was cancelled to do conflict and gun shootings. In 2010 the parade was cancelled due to conflict, as Henery Antoine and Everiste Blaize disputed how and by whom the parade should be organized. The two promoters were not able to resolve their differences and work together. Several years later they were still unable to come to terms. In 2013 Blaize was again in conflict with Matthew Veloza of the group Montreal Carnival Vibration. Issues arose when their float broke down and no one from the Caribbean Cultural Festivities Association took responsibility to resolve the issue. The issue escalated When partners where not happy with CCFA. Montreal Carnival Vibration work one more year with CCFA till trouble continued. Matthew left the organization with all partners and sponsors. In 2016 the parade when on with less than 100 participants in costume and less than 10 floats also the organization is financially unstable. The election of Jason Forbes took place in 2018 and he struggled and Work extremely hard to bring to community together. But it was to late with the beginning of the covid pandemic Jason Forbes announced that he will resign on June 1 2021.

See also 

 Caribana

References

External links
Montreal Carifiesta

Afro-Caribbean culture in Canada
Black Canadian culture in Quebec
Caribbean-Canadian culture
Music festivals in Montreal
Parades in Canada
Festivals established in 1974
1974 establishments in Quebec
Carnivals in Canada
Black Canadian organizations